Asuran is a 1995 Tamil language horror film, with cinematography and direction by Velu Prabhakaran and written and  produced  by R. K. Selvamani. The film stars Arun Pandian and Roja, while Radharavi, Napoleon and Senthil play supporting roles. The film became a failure at the box office. Mansoor Ali Khan reprised his role of Veerabhadran from Captain Prabhakaran. The film is an unsanctioned amalgamation of the various Hollywood films including Predator (1987).

Cast

 Arun Pandian as Prasad
 Roja as Parvathi (Voice dubbed by Rohini)
 Radha Ravi as Rajasekhar
 Vijayakumar as DGP Raghupathi
 Senthil as Srinivasan
 Mansoor Ali Khan as Veerabhadran
 Thiyagu as Krishnaswamy
 Thalapathi Dinesh as Chandru
 Pandu
 S. N. Lakshmi
 Vichithra as Balamani
 Sathishkumar as Krishna
 Krishnamoorthy
 Krishnaraj Muthuramalingam as Krishna
 Naga Kannan
 Kalyan as main dancer in "Vathikuchu Pathikuchu"
 Napoleon as Marthayan (guest appearance)

Soundtrack
Music was composed by Aadithyan. The song "Chakku Chakku Vathikuchi" written by Piraisoodan was very popular in this movie. That song programming was done by Harris Jayaraj. The song was also featured in the 2022 film Vikram where it became a trend in India after its release.

Reception
Thulasi of Kalki wrote since there is no such thing as story, most of the grandeur did not work out; if the viewer watches it without thinking about logic, they will get the satisfaction of watching Arabian Nights.

References

External links 
 

1990s monster movies
1990s science fiction horror films
1990s Tamil-language films
1995 films
Films directed by Velu Prabhakaran
Films set in forests
Films set in jungles
Indian science fiction horror films